Alex La Guma (20 February 1924 – 11 October 1985) was a South African novelist, leader of the South African Coloured People's Organisation (SACPO) and a defendant in the Treason Trial, whose works helped characterise the movement against the apartheid era in South Africa. La Guma's vivid style, distinctive dialogue, and realistic, sympathetic portrayal of oppressed groups have made him one of the most notable South African writers of the 20th century. La Guma was awarded the 1969 Lotus Prize for Literature.

Biography
La Guma was born in District Six, Cape Town, South Africa. He was the son of James La Guma, a leading figure in both the Industrial and Commercial Workers' Union and the South African Communist Party.

La Guma attended Trafalgar High School in District Six in Cape Town. After graduating from a technical school in 1945, he was an active member of the Plant Workers Union of the Metal Box Company. He was fired after organizing a strike, and he became active in politics, joining the Young Communists League in 1947 and the South African Communist Party in 1948. La Guma stood against the leader of the African People's Organisation, Dr Abdullah Abdurahman for a seat on the City Council in September 1939, but was beaten by 1083 votes to 263. The Standard newspaper headlined the story: "Dr A. swamps La Guma."

In 1956 he helped organise the South Africa representatives who drew up the Freedom Charter, and consequently he was one of the 156 accused at the Treason Trials that same year.  He published his first short story, "Nocturn", in 1957. In 1960 he began writing for New Age, a progressive newspaper, and in 1962 he was placed under house arrest. Before his five-year sentence could elapse, A No Trial Act was passed and he and his wife were put into solitary confinement. On their release from prison, they returned to house arrest. He, along with his wife Blanche and their two children, went into exile to the UK in 1966. La Guma spent the rest of his life in exile.

In 1984 he was appointed Officer of Arts and Letters by the French Ministry of Culture. He was chief representative of the African National Congress in the Caribbean at the time of his death from a heart attack in Havana, Cuba, on 11 October 1985.

Although La Guma was an inspiration of and inspired by the growing resistance to apartheid, notably the Black Consciousness Movement, his connection to these groups was indirect.

Notable works
La Guma's works include the following:

A Walk in the Night and Other Stories (1962), Ibadan, Nigeria: Mbari. Featuring: 1) "A Walk in the Night"; 2) "Tattoo Marks and Nails"; 3) "At the Portagee's"; 4) "The Gladiators"; 5) "Blankets"; 6) "A Matter of Taste"; 7) "The Lemon Orchard"
And a Threefold Cord (1964), (East) Berlin, GDR: Seven Seas Publishers. 
Quartet: Four Voices from South Africa (1963), London: Heinemann. Stories by Alex La Guma, James Matthews, Richard Rive, and Alf Wannenburgh. Featuring: 1) "Out of Darkness"; 2) "Slipper Satin"; 3) "A Glass of Wine"; 4) "Nocturne" by La Guma.
The Stone-Country (1967), (East) Berlin, GDR: Seven Seas Publishers. 
In the Fog of the Seasons' End (1972), London: Heinemann.
A Soviet Journey (1978), Moscow: Progress Publishers.
Time of the Butcherbird (1979), London: Heinemann.

References

Further reading 
Kathleen M. Balutansky. The Novels of Alex La Guma: The Representation of a Political Conflict. Three Continents Press, 1990.
Chandramohan, Balasubramanyam, A Study in Trans-Ethnicity in Modern South Africa: The Writings of Alex La Guma, 1925–1985. Lewiston, New York, and Lampeter, Wales: Mellen Research University Press, 1992.
Roger Field. Alex La Guma: A Literary and Political Biography. Woodbridge, UK: James Currey, 2010.
Ian Fullerton. Politics and the South African Novel in English, in Bold, Christine (ed.), Cencrastus No 3, Summer 1980, pp.22 & 23
Christopher J. Lee (ed.), A Soviet Journey: A Critical Annotated Edition. Lexington Books, 2017.
Tribute to Alex La Guma in Rixaka, cultural journal of ANC, No. 3/86.

External links
Alex La Guma biography from South African History Online
"Language games, Alex La Guma's fiction, and the new post-apartheid reality for the South African writer" – analysis of La Guma's contributions against South African apartheid
"Alex La Guma Gains Lotus Prize" – news article from 1971, with photograph

1924 births
1985 deaths
Writers from Cape Town
Cape Coloureds
Members of the South African Communist Party
Members of the African National Congress
Anti-apartheid activists
Marxist writers
South African journalists
South African male novelists
People acquitted of treason
South African prisoners and detainees
Prisoners and detainees of South Africa
20th-century South African novelists
Alumni of Trafalgar High School (Cape Town)
20th-century journalists